FFTPACK is a package of Fortran subroutines for the fast Fourier transform.  It includes complex, real, sine, cosine, and quarter-wave transforms. It was developed by Paul Swarztrauber of the National Center for Atmospheric Research, and is included in the general-purpose mathematical library SLATEC.

Much of the package is also available in C and Java translations.

See also 
 FFTW
 LAPACK

References 
 
 
 

Computer libraries
FFT algorithms
Public-domain software with source code